{{Infobox storm
| image = Lake Huron Cyclone 1996-09-14 1745Z.png
| caption = The cyclone at peak intensity on September 14.
| type = Extratropical cyclone
| formed = 
| dissipated = 
| 1-min winds = 65
| lowest pressure = 992
| damages = Unknown
| fatalities = None
| areas affected = Great Lakes region, Eastern Canada
| season = 1996 Atlantic hurricane season (unofficially)
}}

The 1996 Lake Huron cyclone, commonly referred to as Hurricane Huron and Hurroncane''', was an extremely rare, strong cyclonic storm system that developed over Lake Huron in September 1996. The system resembled a subtropical cyclone at its peak, bearing some characteristics of a tropical cyclone. It was the first time such a storm has ever been recorded forming over the Great Lakes region.

Overview of tropical storms in the Great Lakes region

The Great Lakes region has experienced the remnants of several hurricanes, most commonly those which originally made U.S. landfall along the Gulf of Mexico. Very few such storms retain any tropical characteristics by the time they reached the Great Lakes. In general, the strongest of these storms resulted from interactions between a hurricane remnant and an extratropical weather system. Only two such storms had hurricane-force winds over the Great Lakes.

After merging with a strong cold front, the remnant of the 1941 Texas hurricane had hurricane-force winds over Lake Huron and Lake Ontario, with steady winds of  reported over Detroit. Half of the resulting deaths occurred in Toronto, and many injuries resulted from windows blown out in Detroit. Although the center of the storm was tracked over Chicago and other highly populated areas, no other inland region reported similar damage. Similar to the 1996 Lake Huron cyclone, the 1941 hurricane tracked over the Great Lakes in September, when the lakes are at their warmest.

Hurricane Hazel entered the Great Lakes region as an extratropical storm just west of Toronto. However, the remnant interacted with a trough just south of Lake Erie, resulting in explosive strengthening as it entered the Great Lakes region. Hurricane Hazel was an October storm with winds equivalent to a Category 1 hurricane by the time it reached Canada, but most of its damage was caused by extreme rainfall on already-saturated ground.

In contrast, the 1996 Lake Huron cyclone developed tropical characteristics over the Great Lakes region completely independent of precursor tropical cyclones. This makes it unique among Great Lakes storms.

Meteorological history

On September 11, 1996, a weak low-pressure area was situated close to Lake Superior, as well as a shortwave trough over Ontario. The northwest tilt of the low in the atmosphere indicated that the surface center was strengthening, due to baroclinic forcing. In addition to this, analyses of the atmosphere concluded that the cyclone's circulation extended into the upper troposphere.

By September 12, the cyclone had been steered by a cold front to a position over Lake Huron, with the cyclone's upper-level circulation centered to the west, over Michigan. After 12:00 UTC on September 12, the low moved southeastward and became more vertically organized.

The cyclone briefly passed over Lake Huron as it proceeded southeastward. The cyclone's lower levels experienced the highest intensification. As the cyclone's component layers were well-stacked, the storm was ripe for development. Eventually, the cold front to the north, which was connected to the surface low, became an occluded front, as it entangled with the surface warm front. The occluded front extended from Lake Huron to Pennsylvania on September 13. A  swath of showers and thunderstorms was positioned across the area. More showers were centered near the occluded low.

Between 12:00 UTC on September 13 and 00:00 UTC on September 14, a shortwave trough rotated throughout the area of the occluded front. This caused the mid-level portion of the cyclone to move eastward, centering itself just east of Lake Huron. In response to this intensification, the maximum sustained winds of the storm increased as well. After 00:00 UTC on September 14, the lower-level and mid-level circulations of the cyclone moved westward, becoming vertically-stacked again. In contrast to the earlier developments, the baroclinic processes of the system weakened rapidly, and the system became more shallow.

In addition to the eye, convective clouds had also formed, creating an eyewall resembling that seen in tropical cyclones. Soon afterward, prevailing winds in the area shifted to the east-northeast and rapidly increased, shearing the system, causing it to weaken. In contrast to the earlier stages of the system's life, the system was now much shallower and harbored energy closer to the surface. Surface analysis indicated that the cyclone had multiple central circulations at the time, with a weaker cyclonic circulation persisting over the eastern shore of Lake Huron and another center north of Lake Ontario. During this 12-hour period, the cyclone decayed rapidly, mainly in the lower troposphere. On September 15, the cyclone weakened into a remnant low and left Lake Huron, before dissipating soon afterward. High waves were also created by the storm in Lake Erie.

Impact

Excessive rain of over  fell over the land surrounding the Great Lakes. This caused flooding in both the United States around Buffalo, New York and on the eastern shore of Lake Huron in Ontario, Canada. However, other than the flooding caused by the storm, there were no reports of fatalities or further significant damage from the storm. The storm also caused significant erosion along the shoreline, and resulted in the loss of several homes and businesses. Additionally, the storm caused several deaths and resulted in millions of dollars in damages. The storm was a reminder of the potential for severe weather in the Great Lakes region and the importance of preparedness and response planning.

Notes

See also

1996 Atlantic hurricane season
Hurricane Fran
Extratropical cyclone
2006 Central Pacific cyclone
Subtropical Cyclone Katie
2018 Southeast Pacific subtropical cyclone
South Atlantic tropical cyclone
Mediterranean tropical-like cyclone
List of storms on the Great Lakes
List of Canada hurricanes
Brown ocean effect
Subtropical Storm 96C
1975 Pacific Northwest hurricane

References

External links

 (Paper discussing computer simulations of "Hurricane Huron").

Huron
Lake Huron Cyclone, 1996
Lake Huron Cyclone, 1996
1996
1996
Lake Huron
Subtropical cyclones
Extratropical cyclones
September 1996 events in North America